Jaime de los Santos (born April 1946 in Nueva Ecija, Philippines) is a retired military general in the Philippines. He joined the Philippine Army in 1969 after graduating from the Philippine Military Academy with a degree Bachelor of Science in Military Engineering. De los Santos later on served as a brigade commander, chief of staff and commanding general of an infantry division and superintendent of the Philippine Military Academy.

In December 1999, United Nations Secretary-General Kofi Annan appointed de los Santos as the Force Commander of the United Nations Transitional Administration in East Timor (UNTAET). The International Force East Timor (INTERFET) commanded by Australian Major General Peter Cosgrove transitioned to the UNTAET Peacekeeping Force (PKF) on 23 February 2000. Santos was the first Filipino officer to lead an international peacekeeping force in foreign soil.

In 2001, President Gloria Macapagal Arroyo appointed de los Santos as the chief of staff and the commanding general of the Philippine Army of the Armed Forces of the Philippines. He retired from military service in April 2002.

Awards in military service
  Philippine Republic Presidential Unit Citation
  People Power I Unit Citation
  People Power II Ribbon
  Martial Law Unit Citation
  Distinguished Service Stars
   1 Distinguished Conduct Star
  Presidential Medal of Merit
  1 Outstanding Achievement Medal
   Gawad sa Kaunlaran
   Bronze Cross Medals
  Military Merit Medals  with one silver and three bronze anahaws
   Silver Wing Medal
   Military Commendation Medals
  Military Civic Action Medal 
   Sagisag ng Ulirang Kawal
  Long Service Medal
  United Nations Service Medal
   Anti-dissidence Campaign Medal 
  Luzon Anti-Dissidence Campaign Medal
  Visayas Anti-Dissidence Campaign Medal
  Mindanao Anti-Dissidence Campaign Medal
  Disaster Relief and Rehabilitation Operations Ribbon
  United Nations Transitional Administration in East Timor (UNTAET) Ribbon
  AFP Parachutist Badge
  Combat Commander's Badge (Philippines)
 Philippine Air Force Gold Wings Badge

References

1946 births
Living people
Filipino generals
Philippine Military Academy alumni
People from Nueva Ecija